Michael Jay Tarses (born July 3, 1939) is an American screenwriter, producer, actor. He created and produced The Days and Nights of Molly Dodd  and The Slap Maxwell Story, co-created Buffalo Bill (with Tom Patchett), and was an executive producer for The Bob Newhart Show.

Tarses was born in Baltimore, Maryland. He graduated from Williams College in 1961. He was co-creator and co-writer (with Andy Hamilton) of BBC Radio 4's situation comedy Revolting People, which was set in colonial-era Baltimore; he played the role of sour shopkeeper Samuel Oliphant to Hamilton's cheerfully corrupt British soldier Sergeant McGurk. His most notable acting role was as Coach Bobby Finstock in the 1980s teen comedy Teen Wolf (1985). He also co-starred with Jim Carrey on the sitcom The Duck Factory in 1984. In 1990, he received an exclusive deal with NBC.

Personal life
Tarses and his wife, Rachel, have three children: TV executive Jamie Tarses (1964-2021); TV writer Matt Tarses; and teacher and writer Mallory Tarses. An emergency exit at MassMoCA is named in honor of Tarses and his wife.

Selected filmography
The Bob Newhart Show (1972-1976, TV)
The Carol Burnett Show (1972-1978, TV)
The Tony Randall Show (1976-1978, TV, Co-creator, with Tom Patchett) 
We've Got Each Other (1977-1978, TV)
Mary (1978, TV)
Up the Academy (1980, feature film, with Tom Patchett)
The Great Muppet Caper (1981, feature film, with Tom Patchett, Jerry Juhl and Jack Rose)
Open All Night (1981-1982, TV, Creator)
Buffalo Bill (1983-1984, TV, Co-creator, with Tom Patchett)
The Muppets Take Manhattan (1984, feature film with Tom Patchett and Frank Oz)
The Slap Maxwell Story (1987-1988, TV, Creator)
The Days and Nights of Molly Dodd (1987-1991, TV, Creator)
Black Tie Affair (1993, TV)
Public Morals (1996, TV, Co-creator, with Steven Bochco)

Radio
Revolting People (2000) (BBC, Co-Creator, with Andy Hamilton)

References

External links
 

1939 births
Living people
American television producers
American television writers
American male television writers
Emmy Award winners
Writers from Baltimore
American male television actors
Male actors from Baltimore
20th-century American male actors
21st-century American male actors
Screenwriters from Maryland